Southport Historic District is a national historic district located at Southport, Brunswick County, North Carolina.  The district encompasses 161 contributing buildings, 3 contributing sites, and 1 contributing object.  Over half of the structures in the historic district date from the 1885-1905 period.  It includes residential, commercial, and institutional buildings and is considered the best example of a Victorian coastal town in North Carolina.  Notable buildings include the River Pilots Tower and Building (1940s), Frying Pan Lightship (20th century), Fort Johnston Officers Quarters (c. 1805-09), Walker-Pike House (c. 1800-20), Brunswick Inn (c. 1859), Fort Johnston Hospital (c. 1852-1860), Former Brunswick County Court House (c. 1854), Saint Philips Episcopal Church (c. 1860, 1894–96), Trinity Methodist Church (1888-1890), and the Adkins-Ruark House (1890).

It was added to the National Register of Historic Places in 1980.

Gallery

References

Historic districts on the National Register of Historic Places in North Carolina
Buildings and structures in Brunswick County, North Carolina
National Register of Historic Places in Brunswick County, North Carolina
Houses in Brunswick County, North Carolina